Valley City is a city in Barnes County, North Dakota, United States. It is the county seat of Barnes County. The population was 6,575 during the 2020 census, making it the 12th largest city in North Dakota. Valley City was founded in 1874.

Valley City is known for its many bridges over the Sheyenne River, including the Hi-Line Railroad Bridge. These bridges have earned it the nickname "City of Bridges". The city is also the home of Valley City State University and the North Dakota High School Activities Association (NDHSAA).

History
Valley City was established in 1874 with the building of a railroad station. The town was originally named Worthington after the town's promoter, George Worthington. The present name is for the city's location in the valley of the Sheyenne River. A post office was established under the name Worthington in 1874, and has continued to operate under the name Valley City since 1878.
A Carnegie Library opened in 1903 through the efforts of the "Tuesday Club," a local women's organization. The inception of the nation's first barber association occurred in Valley City during a state barber convention in February, 1909.

Geography

Valley City is located at  (46.924632, −98.005438).

Demographics

2010 census
As of the census of 2010, there were 6,585 people, 2,986 households, and 1,563 families living in the city. The racial makup of the city was 95.2% White, 1.2% African American, 0.7% Native American, 0.8% Asian, 0.2% from other races, and 1.7% from two or more races. Hispanic or Latino of any race were 1.5%.

Of the 2,986 households 22.6% had children under the age of 18 living with them, 41.1% were married couples living together, 7.9% had a female householder with no husband present, 3.3% had a male householder with no wife present, and 47.7% were non-families. 39.4% of households were one person and 17.9% were one person aged 65 or older. The average household size was 2.04 and the average family size was 2.74.

The median age was 42.1 years. 18.7% of residents were under the age of 18; 13.2% were between the ages of 18 and 24; 21.1% were from 25 to 44; 24.9% were from 45 to 64; and 22% were 65 or older. The gender makeup of the city was 48.1% male and 51.9% female.

2000 census
As of the census of 2000, there were 6,826 people, 2,996 households, and 1,668 families living in the city. The population density was 2,062.5 per square mile (796.2/km). There were 3,250 housing units at an average density of 982.0 per square mile (379.1/km). The racial makup of the city was 97.39% White, 0.73% African American, 0.75% Native American, 0.28% Asian, 0.19% from other races, and 0.66% from two or more races. Hispanic or Latino of any race were 0.82% of the population.

The top 6 ancestry groups in the city are German (45.5%), Norwegian (38.8%), Irish (9.1%), Swedish (5.2%), French (4.8%), English (3.8%).

Of the 2,996 households 23.3% had children under the age of 18 living with them, 44.6% were married couples living together, 8.1% had a female householder with no husband present, and 44.3% were non-families. 38.3% of households were one person and 19.6% were one person aged 65 or older. The average household size was 2.09 and the average family size was 2.77.

The age distribution was 18.8% under the age of 18, 15.3% from 18 to 24, 21.4% from 25 to 44, 21.4% from 45 to 64, and 23.1% 65 or older. The median age was 41 years. For every 100 females, there were 89.4 males. For every 100 females age 18 and over, there were 87.5 males.

The median household income was $28,050 and the median family income was $41,604. Males had a median income of $30,035 versus $17,667 for females. The per capita income for the city was $16,257. About 5.5% of families and 12.4% of the population were below the poverty line, including 11.9% of those under age 18 and 12.8% of those age 65 or over.

Local media

AM radio

FM radio

 CSiCable

The local newspaper is the Valley City Times-Record.

Education

K–12
Valley City is served by the Valley City Public School District which consists of Jefferson Elementary School, Washington Elementary School, and Valley City Junior/Senior High School. St. Catherine's Catholic School for grade K–6 also serves students in Valley City.

Higher education
 Valley City State University

Sites of interest

 Hi-Line Railroad Bridge
 North Dakota Winter Show
 North Country Trail
The Rosebud Visitor Center contains a restored railway passenger car.

 The Vault (Coffee Shop)

Notable people

 Jeff Boschee, professional basketball player
 Paul Fjelde, sculptor; professor at Pratt Institute
 John E. Grotberg, congressman
 Peggy Lee, jazz and popular music singer, songwriter, composer, and actress
 George W. Mason, chairman and CEO of Kelvinator and American Motors Company
 James M. McPherson, Civil War historian; Pulitzer Prize winner
 Gerhard Brandt Naeseth, genealogist; founder of the Norwegian-American Genealogical Center & Naeseth Library
 Earl Pomeroy, congressman
 Ann Sothern, film and TV actress with two stars on the Hollywood Walk of Fame
 Herman Stern, proprietor of Straus Clothing, businessman, humanitarian, social and economic activist
 Tyrell Terry, NBA player
 Carol Thurston, actress
 Frank White, eighth governor of North Dakota and treasurer of the United States (1921–1928)
Michael Wobbema, member of the North Dakota Senate
 George M. Young, congressman, judge

Climate
This climatic region is typified by large seasonal temperature differences, with warm to hot (and often humid) summers and cold (sometimes severely cold) winters. According to the Köppen Climate Classification system Valley City has a humid continental climate, abbreviated "Dfb" on climate maps.

References

External links

 
 Valley City, North Dakota official tourism website
 Valley City, North Dakota official city government website
 Community data for industry: Valley City, North Dakota (1980) from the Digital Horizons website

Cities in North Dakota
Cities in Barnes County, North Dakota
County seats in North Dakota
Populated places established in 1874
1874 establishments in Dakota Territory